Elizabeth Miklosi (born August 10, 1983), known professionally as Lizzy Valentine, is a former American professional wrestler, valet, model, and actress. She is best known from MTV's Wrestling Society X.

Professional wrestling career

Training (2000)
Valentine was trained by Homicide and began her career under the ring name Miss Led with the Long Island Wrestling Federation and the Northeast independent circuit. She also appeared in numerous other independent wrestling promotions, managing multiple wrestlers and feuding with multiple others.

Independent circuit (2000–2010)
In Jersey All Pro Wrestling, she managed Dixie and had her first professional match against April Hunter. Mikosi also managed Nick Berk and Z-Barr in Liberty All-Star Wrestling in Philadelphia and NWA Florida. Valentine also had a career long feud with Alexis Laree. The two faced each other up and down the East Coast in KAPOW!, Southern Championship Wrestling, and Dangerous Women of Wrestling. Valentine has also teamed with the Ballard Brothers in various promotions. She even toured Alaska and wrestled matches for the troops in the Middle East. And as J-Love, she feuded with Pogo the Clown in Xtreme Pro Wrestling.  In one match, Elizabeth flipped Tracy Brooks down to the mat by the hair.

In early 2009 Valentine took part in the first season tapings of Wrestlicious, where she performed under the ring name Kandi Kisses. The show premiered on March 1, 2010. She debuted in the first episode, lip syncing to a song in front of the crowd. She made her in-ring debut on the sixth episode, losing to Lil Slamm.

On December 21, 2009, at the tapings of Total Nonstop Action Wrestling's Impact! television show Valentine defeated Amber O'Neal in a tryout dark match.

Lizzy appeared on Lucha Libre USA as Lizzy Valentine Carter. She was a member of The Right with R. J. Brewer and Petey Williams.

Total Nonstop Action Wrestling
Valentine also had a brief stint as a TNA Knockout in Total Nonstop Action Wrestling. She first competed as JV Love on TNA Xplosion in a match against Tracy Brooks. She was then repackaged as a new character named Cheerleader Valentina and replaced Brooks as the partner of Nurse Veronica in the all-female stable known as Bitchslap. In their first appearance together, they attacked the TNA cage dancers during a dance routine, but were separated by TNA security. A match was finally scheduled between Bitchslap (Stevens and Valentine) and the TNA cage dancers (April Pennington and Lollipop). However, before the match could fully start it was interrupted by Trinity, who revealed herself as the newest member of Bitchslap and attacked Pennington and Lollipop. The TNA cage dancers retaliated against Bitchslap the following week. They summoned Bitchslap to the ring; however, Trinity forced Stevens and Valentine into the ring to fight the cage dancers. Pennington and Lollipop attacked Stevens and Valentine with leather straps until they fled up the entrance ramp to rejoin Trinity. 
	 	
The storyline with Bitchslap was then dropped because TNA didn't have enough female wrestlers to compete against the group, and Stevens turned down a two-year contract with TNA, instead attempting to sign with either WWE or a company in Japan. Brooks and Trinity were then placed into other storylines and TNA stopped booking Miklosi.

After her time with TNA, Valentine debuted for Ultimate Pro Wrestling in California and began managing Pro Wrestling Guerrilla heavyweight champion Adam Pearce. Miklosi then auditioned for the 2005 Diva Search held by World Wrestling Entertainment; however, she was not selected as a finalist.

Wrestling Society X
In 2006, Valentine performed in the short-lived MTV wrestling series Wrestling Society X under the ring name Lizzy Valentine as a valet and girlfriend for Matt Sydal as a heel.

On the July 29 edition of Wrestling Society X, Sydal defeated Human Tornado after an interference from Valentine. Valentine accompanied Sydal to the ring where he defeated Scorpio Sky, After the match, Valentine wrote "Hater" on his back. Sydal began a feud with Syxx-Pac over Valentine, but WSX folded before they ever had a match.

Wrestlicious (2009–2010)
In early 2009, she took part in the first season tapings of Wrestlicious, which started airing in March 2010, using the character of Kandi Kisses, known as "The Britney Spears of Wrestling." She made her debut on March 1 of the first episode of Takedown, performing her new song but was caught lip syncing, causing the fans to turn on her, turning her heel in the process. She made her singles debut on May 26 in the main event of Takedown'', facing Lil' Slamm in a singles match, where she lost via pinfall.

Championships and accomplishmentsKAPOW!KAPOW! Women's Championship (1 time)Ultimate Pro Wrestling'''
UPW Women's Championship (1 time)

References

Further reading
An interview with Lizzy Valentine, conducted by Genickbruch.com

External links
 

1983 births
American female professional wrestlers
Living people
Professional wrestlers from New York (state)
Sportspeople from New York City
WWE Diva Search contestants
21st-century American women
21st-century professional wrestlers
Professional wrestlers from New York City